The Call of Duty World League Championship 2019 was a Call of Duty: Black Ops 4 tournament on PlayStation 4 which took place from August 14–18, 2019. The tournament was won by the  team consisting of Alec "Arcitys" Sanderson, Preston "Prestinni" Sanderson, James "Clayster" Eubanks, Tyler "aBeZy" Pharris and Chris "Simp" Lehr, with Chris Lehr being chosen as the tournament's MVP.

Overview

The Call of Duty World Championship is a yearly tournament containing all of the best pro and top amateur teams in the world. The 2019 World Championship had a 2 million dollar prize pool with $800,000 awarded to the winning team. The event took place in Pauley Pavilion in Los Angeles, California.

Rules

Each team of the 32 teams that qualified would first be sorted into groups of 4 and would play all 3 other teams in the group. Once finished, the top 2 teams would advance to the winners bracket, the 3rd place team advance to the losers bracket, and the last place team would be eliminated. Teams would then compete in double elimination style bracket until there was crowned a winner. The series were best of 5, with the 3 modes being played. Map 1 and 4 would be Hardpoint (a race to 250 points), map 2 and 5 would be Search and Destroy (a race to 6 round victories), and map 3 would be Control (a race to 3 round victories).

Qualified Teams
The 16 teams which qualified for 2019 CWL Pro League were the first teams to qualify for the 2018 Call of Duty Championship. They were joined by the top 16 amateur teams from the CWL Finals Open Bracket.

Flags represent the nationality of the majority of players on a team's active roster, not the country in which the organization is based.

Groups
The draw for the groups took place on 31 July 2019.

Final standings

References

External links

2019 in Los Angeles
2019 in sports in California
2019 first-person shooter tournaments
Call of Duty Championship